The Jon Tiven Group recorded and released two albums in the 1990s: Blue Guru and Yes I Ram. The members were Jon Tiven (guitar), Alan Merrill (lead vocals), Sally Tiven (bass guitar) and Todd Snare (drums). The two albums resulted in many cover versions of the band's songs by artists such as Wilson Pickett, Huey Lewis and the News, Jeff Healey, B. B. King, Robert Cray, Billie Ray Martin, Buddy Guy, "Sir" Mack Rice, and Freddie Scott.

Discography

Albums
 Blue Guru (1996)
 Yes I Ram (1999)

Single
 "He Don't Know" (1996)

Jon Tiven Group, The